Fehmi Sağınoğlu (1937 – 19 September 2016) was a Turkish footballer. He played in 18 matches for the Turkey national football team from 1965 to 1968.

References

1937 births
2016 deaths
Turkish footballers
Turkey international footballers
Place of birth missing
Association footballers not categorized by position
Turkish football managers
Kasımpaşa S.K. managers